Abominator may refer to:
 Abominator (album), album by American horror punk/heavy metal Doyle, released in 2013
 Abominator (band), Australian heavy metal band